Udy may refer to:

People
 Dan Udy (1874–1935), New Zealand rugby union player.
 Giles Udy (born 1956), English writer and historian of the Soviet Gulag system.
 Gloster Udy (1918–2003), Australian Uniting Church minister and author.
 Hart Udy (1857–1934), New Zealand rugby union player.
 James Udy (1920–2003), Australian Uniting Church minister.
 Marvin J. Udy (1892-1959), American engineer.

Other
 Udy (river), a river in Belgorod Oblast (Russia) and Kharkiv Oblast (Ukraine).
 Udy (village), a village in Kharkiv Oblast, Ukraine.